The San Francisco Comedy Competition (sometimes referred to as the San Francisco International Comedy Competition or The San Francisco International Stand-Up Comedy Competition) is a stand-up comedy contest held each September in San Francisco, California, and neighboring areas of Northern California.

History

The SFICC was originally conceived by Bay Area comedian Frank Kidder. However, it has been produced since its inception by Jon and Anne Fox, who now retain complete ownership after purchasing Kidder's share.

The competition has evolved from two nights of 20 comics performing, to its current multi-week format.

The Competition

Hundreds of comedians each year submit applications to enter the contest. Of these, 32 are chosen to perform in one of two week-long preliminary rounds. In these prelims, comedians perform sets of 5 to 7 minutes in length and the top five from each preliminary round move on to the semi-finals.

The semi-final round is another week of shows, with the 10 semi-finalists performing sets of 10 to 12 minutes. From this group, five finalists are chosen.

Finalists must prove themselves in yet another week of shows, this time performing sets ranging in length from 12 to 15 minutes.

Penalties are assessed for comedians who go over or under the time constraints.

The performances are judged on the following criteria:  Material, Stage Presence, Delivery, Technique, Audience Response, Audience Rapport, and the judges' "Gut Feeling" about the performer. Typically, the judges, who are different at each event, are previous competitors, members of the media, talent agents/scouts and representatives from the performance venue. There is also an extra point awarded given by the audience through their applause after a comedian's performance. If the audience gives a ten-count of enthusiastic applause, the extra point is awarded.

Venues are varied and wide-ranged to ensure that the performers can play to all types of audience and have included bars, clubs, casinos, colleges, theatres and more.

Previous winners

Notable

Marsha Warfield, in 1979, became the competition's first African-American winner and its first female winner. She is also the only woman to win in the entire history of the SFICC.

Among the big names who entered, but did not advance to the semi-finals are Roseanne Barr, Janeane Garofalo, Bobcat Goldthwait, Christopher Titus and D.L. Hughley.

Don Friesen won in 1999 and again in 2005, making him the only person to have won the competition more than once.

Paul Ogata's win in 2007 was the first by an Asian-American comedian in 32 years of the competition.

After 44 years of holding the event annually, the competition did not run during 2020 due to the COVID-19 pandemic.  The competition returned in 2021.

References

External links
 Official website of the competition

Comedy competitions
Culture of San Francisco